San Rocco al Porto (Lodigiano,) is a comune (municipality) in the Province of Lodi in the Italian region Lombardy, located about  southeast of Milan and about  southeast of Lodi.

San Rocco al Porto borders the following municipalities: Fombio, Santo Stefano Lodigiano, Calendasco, Guardamiglio, Piacenza.

Notable people 

 Domenico Mezzadri, (1867–1936), bishop of Chioggia

Demographic evolution

Other images

References

External links
 www.comune.san-rocco-al-porto.lo.it

Cities and towns in Lombardy